Colin Beesley (born 6 October 1951) is an English former professional footballer who played as a winger for Sunderland.

References

1951 births
Living people
Footballers from Stockton-on-Tees
English footballers
Association football wingers
Sunderland A.F.C. players
English Football League players